The 1992 United States Senate election in Florida took place on November 3, 1992 alongside other elections to the United States Senate in other states as well as elections to the United States House of Representatives and various state and local elections. Incumbent Democratic U.S. Senator Bob Graham won re-election to a second term.

Democratic primary

Candidates
 Bob Graham, incumbent United States Senator
 Jim Mahorner, attorney

Results

Republican primary

Candidates
 Hugh Brotherton
 Bill Grant, former U.S. Representative
 Rob Quartel, former member of the Federal Maritime Commission

Declined to run
 Norman Schwarzkopf, retired United States Army general and United States Central Command commander during the Gulf War

Results

General election

Candidates
 Bob Graham (D), incumbent U.S. Senator
 Bill Grant (R), former U.S. Representative

Results
Graham defeated Grant in a landslide, as Grant won just one county in the state (Okaloosa County, Florida). There were no third party or independent candidates.

See also
 1992 United States Senate elections

References

1992 Florida elections
Florida
1992